John Watters (c. 1920 – 12 August 2012) was a Scottish footballer who played for Celtic and Airdrieonians and later went on to become physio at Sunderland. He served as a medic in the Royal Navy during the Second World War.

References

Place of birth missing
Place of death missing
2012 deaths
Celtic F.C. players
Scottish footballers
Royal Navy personnel of World War II
Year of birth uncertain
Airdrieonians F.C. (1878) players
Sunderland A.F.C. non-playing staff
Association footballers not categorized by position